Joseph Torgesen is an Emeritus Professor of Psychology and Education at Florida State University.  At the time of his retirement from the university in 2008, he was the W. Russell and Eugenia Morcom Chair of Psychology and Education and Director of the Florida Center for Reading Research. Dr. Torgesen received his Ph.D. in Developmental and Clinical Psychology from the University of Michigan in 1976, and served on the Psychology faculty at FSU from 1976 until 2008.

Dr. Torgesen's early research focused on memory processes in children with learning disabilities, but most of his career was spent investigating and writing about the language difficulties of children with specific developmental reading disabilities (dyslexia).  He is the author or co-author of over 230 books, book chapters, and articles on the psychology of reading, reading disabilities, and reading instruction. He is also the author, with Dr. Richard Wagner and Dr. Carol Rashotte, of two of the most widely used diagnostic tests for dyslexia, The Comprehensive Test of Phonological Processes and the Test of Word Reading Efficiency.

In 2002, Dr. Torgesen was asked by Governor Jeb Bush of Florida to establish a center for reading research at Florida State University. The center was to have a four part mission: 1)to conduct basic research on reading and reading instruction; 2) to disseminate information about research-based practices in reading instruction and assessment; 3) to conduct applied research related to policy and practice in literacy instruction in Florida; and 4) to provide technical assistance to Florida's schools and the State Department of Education.  Since its establishment in 2002, the Florida Center for Reading Research has grown to become one of the leading research centers in reading in the world, with 9 permanent faculty and over 300 current employees. The website for the center can be found at http://www.fcrr.org/

References

Year of birth missing (living people)
Living people
Florida State University faculty
21st-century American psychologists
University of Michigan alumni